Dendroicius is a monotypic genus of east Asian jumping spiders containing the single species, Dendroicius hotaruae. It was first described by Y. J. Lin and S. Q. Li in 2020, who distinguished it from Icius, but did not place it into a subfamily.

See also
 List of Salticidae genera

References

Monotypic Salticidae genera
Spiders of China